Natura & Co is a Brazilian global personal care cosmetics group headquartered in São Paulo. The Natura & Co Group currently includes Natura Cosméticos, Aesop, The Body Shop and Avon Products.  The Group is present in 73 countries across all continents except Antarctica. Natura Cosméticos, the parent company, was founded in 1969 by Antônio Luiz Seabra and became a public company listed on São Paulo Stock Exchange in 2004. Currently the company is the largest Brazilian cosmetics company by revenue. In May 2019 Natura & Co announced that it had entered into definitive agreement to acquire Avon Products, Inc. The transaction was approved by Brazilian regulations authorities in the beginning of November 2019 and was completed in January 2020, making Natura & Co the 4th largest pure-play beauty company in the world.

History
In 1974, Natura adopted direct sales as sales model. In 2018 it had more than 6.6 million "consultants" (resellers) worldwide being the largest in the world.

Natura is a founding member of the Union for Ethical BioTrade, gradually ensuring that its sourcing practices promote the conservation of biodiversity, respect traditional knowledge and assure the equitable sharing of benefits all along the supply chain. During  the steps of their development and production of cosmetics, Natura does not test on animals and follows the most stringent international safety standards.

Being a public company since 2004, its shares are listed on Novo Mercado (the highest level of corporate governance or Stock Exchange Ibovespa). Natura's performance in 2017 shows a consolidated gross revenue of R$9.9 billion, a growth of 24.5% over the previous year. Its consolidated net income was R$670.3 million.

In 2005, they opened their first boutique in Paris, France.

In Brazil, major competitors of Natura are O Boticário, L'Oréal, Estée Lauder Companies, Jequiti and others.

On January 6, 2020, Natura began trading on the New York Stock Exchange (NYSE).

It's acquisition of Avon Products Inc. in 2020 turned Natura into the world’s fourth largest pure-play beauty group.

Business model
Natura is a one-level marketing company.
Natura promotes its image as an eco-friendly, sustainable company (using natural products, working toward sustainable environment and social support etc.). The company also uses ordinary women rather than supermodels in its advertisements.

Natura & Co operates more than 3,200 stores, considering Natura, The Body Shop, and Aesop's operations. The direct sales channel has more than 6 million consultants among all brands. The company also encourages personal development, material and professional consultants and advisors.

References

External links
 
 Natura official website
 The Body Shop official website
 Aesop official website

Cosmetics companies of Brazil
Manufacturing companies based in São Paulo
Brazilian companies established in 1969
Brazilian brands
Manufacturing companies established in 1969
Companies listed on B3 (stock exchange)
Companies listed on the New York Stock Exchange
Direct selling